The Orange Lights are a downtempo/indie/rock band from Newcastle upon Tyne, England.

The group's vocalist is Jason (“Jay”) Hart, former guitarist in Jason Pierce's band Spiritualized. Co-founder of The Orange Lights is Newcastle-based keyboard player and songwriter Paul Tucker, who is also one half of pop/soul duo Lighthouse Family.

Their debut album, Life Is Still Beautiful, was released in 2007 on Blackbird Records and was produced by Ken Nelson and Chris Potter, and mixed by Chris Lord-Alge.

References

External links
http://www.myspace.com/theorangelights

English indie rock groups
Musical groups established in 2007
Musical groups from Newcastle upon Tyne